Mowden Hall School is a co-educational day and boarding preparatory school in the parish of Bywell, in Stocksfield, Northumberland, England approximately  west of Newcastle upon Tyne. It has been part of the Prep Schools Trust since 2007 and is a member of the Independent Association of Preparatory Schools (IAPS) and Association of Governing Bodies of Independent Schools (AGBIS).

History
Mowden Hall School was founded in the eponymous Mowden Hall in Mowden, near Darlington, by Frank Marchbank in 1935. The School was evacuated to Fallbarrow, Windermere, at the start of World War II, before acquiring its present site at Newton Hall, near Newcastle upon Tyne, in 1945; the former building was home to the Department for Education and its predecessor agencies for almost fifty years. Mowden has welcomed girls since 1982, and opened a Pre-Prep Department in 1993.

Much work was done in the School's early years at Newton to convert the former home of the Joicey family—built in 1835 by architect John Dobson—into a fully functioning prep school.

Boarding 
Children can be day pupils, flexi boarders, weekly boarders or full boarders. Full, weekly and flexible boarding are available to pupils in the main prep school (aged 8 and above). Boarders are not allowed to use mobile phones or other electronic devices, but are allowed and communicate with their parents through letters and payphones. Over three-quarters of the children in the prep school board in some capacity, though there is no official compulsion to board to attend.

Sport 
A wide range of activities are available at the school: these include rugby, football, hockey, netball, tennis, cricket, athletics, badminton, cross-country, swimming. The school contains sporting fields, an indoor swimming pool, tennis courts, and a multi-use astroturf pitch.

Internally, the school has sporting competitions between Houses, as well as swimming galas, cross-country running and a full summer Sports Day.

Former pupils
Alexander Armstrong – actor, comedian and presenter
Julian Bicknell – architect
Pete Graves – television presenter and sports correspondent
Michael Jopling, Baron Jopling – former Conservative government minister
Jeremy Mallinson – conservationist
Peter Martell – journalist
Richard Smyth – cricketer

References

 5. https://www.hexham-courant.co.uk/news/18176479.new-headteacher-chosen-mowden-hall/

External links
School website
Profile on the ISC website
Profile on the Good Schools Guide
Ofsted Boarding Inspection Reports
School Information

Boarding schools in Northumberland
Preparatory schools in Northumberland
Educational institutions established in 1935
Church of England private schools in the Diocese of Newcastle
1935 establishments in England
Bywell